The 1971 Virginia Senate elections were held on November 2, 1971, alongside the Virginia House of Delegates election. All 40 seats in the Senate of Virginia were up for election.

Overall results

References

Virginia
1971 Virginia elections
Virginia Senate elections